"Ben" Oumar Sy (8 January 192625 August 2001) was a Malian footballer and football manager. He was the first ever manager for  Stade Malien and the Mali national team.

Career
Sy began playing football with Jeanne d'Arc in French Sudan in the 1940s, and with them won the French West African Cup twice in 1953 and 1956 before retiring shortly after. He received the nickname "Ben" in reference to the then famed Moroccan-French footballer Larbi Benbarek.

In 1960, his old club Jeanne d'Arc and l’Espérance de Médine merged creating Stade Malien, and Sy was appointed their first ever manager. In 1961, he helped Stade Malien win the first ever Malian Cup in 1961. In 1965, he took the team to the final of the first ever CAF Champions League in 1965, where they lost to Oryx Douala. 

In 1962, he was also appointed the first ever manager for the Mali football team after their independence in 1960. He managed the Mali national team and Stade Malien simultaneously for 4 years. After taking the team to the 1965 All-Africa Games, in 1966 he left the team to focus on Stade Malien. He managed Stade Malien until 1975, when he retired. 

Sy died on August 25, 2001, at the age 75. He was buried the next day, and on the same day Stade Malien won their 16th Malian Cup.

The Super Coupe National du Mali is formally named after him, as is the best sports high school in Mali Lycée Sportif Ben Omar Sy.

Honours

Player
Jeanne d'Arc
French West African Cup: 1953, 1956

Manager
Stade Malien
Malian Cup: 1961, 1963, 1970, 1972
Malian Première Division: 1969–1970

References 

1926 births
2001 deaths
Sportspeople from Bamako
Malian footballers
Malian football managers
Mali national football team managers
Stade Malien players
Association football midfielders